"What a Night" is the debut single by British band Loveable Rogues, released in Ireland and the United Kingdom on 19 April 2013. The band were dropped from Syco in October 2013, but the single was featured on their debut album This and That, released in 2014 on Super Duper Records.

Background
Loveable Rogues first announced that they're signed to Syco on June, 2012. In late 2012, the band released a free mixtape through their SoundCloud channel. The collection of songs was released as a free download and was called First Things First. "What a Night" was previewed along with new songs such as "Maybe Baby", "Talking Monkeys" and "Honest".

Music video
Two teaser videos were released before the music video. The first teaser video was uploaded to their Vevo channel on 11 February 2013. The second teaser released two days after or a week before the music video released; on 19 February 2013, the music video was uploaded to their Vevo channel.
The video features the band having a night party with their friends.

Chart performance
"What a Night" debuted on the UK Singles Chart at number 9 on 27 April 2013 after debuting at number 5 on the UK Singles Chart Update.

Track listing
Digital download
 "What a Night" - 2:50
 "Nuthouse" - 3:58
 "What a Night" (feat. Lucky Mason) Sonny J Mason Remix] - 3:41
 "What a Night" (Supasound Radio Remix) - 2:42

Charts

References

2013 songs
2013 debut singles
Syco Music singles
Song recordings produced by Red Triangle (production team)
Songs written by Rick Parkhouse
Songs written by George Tizzard